The DAF-7 gene encodes for the ortholog of GDF11, a ligand of TGF-beta signaling pathway, in the worm Caenorhabditis elegans. When binds to the complex of type II receptor Daf-4 and type I receptor Daf-1, this receptor protein serine/threonine kinase will phosphorylation activate the Smad Protein Daf-8/14.

References 

Caenorhabditis elegans genes